A Is for Accident is the debut live album by American dark cabaret duo The Dresden Dolls, a collection of live and studio recordings from 2001–2003, which was released on May 27, 2003 by Important Records. Future pressings were handled by 8 ft. Records and didn't include the bootleg recording of the band covering "Stand by Your Man" by Tammy Wynette. On October 20, 2009, the band released the album at Bandcamp.com, with two unlisted bonus tracks available to those who purchase the entire album (the digital download version, in  a variety of formats, is free as of 2012).

Most of the tracks were recorded at live shows around the Boston area: T.T. The Bear's Place, the Lizard Lounge, and Sanders Theater in Cambridge, MA; WMBR 88.1 FM at MIT in Cambridge; WBRS 100.1 FM at Brandeis University in Waltham, MA; and the Milky Way in Boston's Jamaica Plain neighborhood. Several of them have local references: Christopher Lydon is a well-known radio interviewer at WBUR in Boston; "Bank of Boston Beauty Queen" takes place in Lexington, MA; "Truce" mentions a number of streets and places in Boston.

Amanda Palmer stated at their 31 October 2010 reunion show that the band owns the rights to this album and receives all proceeds from its distribution.

Track listing

Personnel
 Amanda Palmer – piano, vocals, lyricist, composer, songwriter
 Brian Viglione – drums, guitar
 Meredith Yayanos – violin on "Will"
 Greg Disterhost – guitar on "Stand By Your Man"
 Jim Smith – bass guitar on "Stand By Your Man"

References

The Dresden Dolls albums
2003 live albums
Albums recorded at Brandeis University
Important Records albums